Wholey's , officially known as Robert Wholey & Co. Inc., is a prominent fish market and grocery store in Pittsburgh's historic Strip District neighborhood.  In 2007, The Pittsburgh Post-Gazette wrote that they are a "household word in the region." According to the Pittsburgh Catholic newspaper, "Of course, in Pittsburgh it wouldn’t be fish without Wholey’s," especially regarding the Catholic tradition regarding fish on Fridays.

Robert Wholey & Co. operated wholesale, cold storage, and international divisions out of its Federal Cold Storage building location on Penn Ave until a 2007 sale to a Michigan firm. Demolition on the building, along with its iconic neon fish sign, began in 2021. Robert Wholey Co. continues to operate in the same Strip District retail location.
In addition to the retail store, Wholey's also delivers fresh/frozen seafood and meat items across the United States.

During the 2008 Stanley Cup Finals between the Pittsburgh Penguins and the Detroit Red Wings, Wholey's began checking the ID of any customers suspected of being from the midwest, as a means to prohibit the purchase of an octopus that could be thrown on the ice as part of Detroit superstition.

In 2005, a 23-pound lobster was discovered for sale at Wholey's.  He was nicknamed "Bubba."  Robert Wholey decided to spare the lobster and sent him to the Pittsburgh Zoo & PPG Aquarium, who had planned to transport him to a Ripley's Believe It or Not! aquarium.  He died the next day.

In 2012, Wholey's celebrated its 100th anniversary with a three–day celebration.

Luke Wholey, a member of the Wholey family, opened a seafood restaurant called Wild Alaskan Grille.

Gallery

References

Companies based in Pittsburgh
Culture of Pittsburgh
Fish markets
1912 establishments in Pennsylvania
Retail companies established in 1912